Julian Salatzki (born 13 December 1993) is a German ice dancer. With partner Ria Schiffner, he is the 2013 German national junior silver medalist and finished 16th at the 2014 World Junior Championships.

Programs 
(with Schiffner)

Competitive highlights 
(with Schiffner)

References

External links 
 

1993 births
German male ice dancers
Living people
Figure skaters from Berlin